People's National Bank Building, also known as Franklin's Clothing Store, is a historic bank building located at Rock Hill, South Carolina. It was built about 1909–1910, and is a four-story brick building, plus basement. It was the first building in the city constructed as a speculative office building, the first with a passenger elevator, and the tallest commercial building in Rock Hill. The People's National Bank merged with Citizens and Southern National Bank of South Carolina in 1964 and moved out of the building in 1972.

It was listed on the National Register of Historic Places in 1999.

References

Bank buildings on the National Register of Historic Places in South Carolina
Commercial buildings completed in 1910
Buildings and structures in Rock Hill, South Carolina
National Register of Historic Places in Rock Hill, South Carolina